Peter Alan Rhind (born 20 June 1945) is a Scottish former first-class cricketer.

Rhind was born at Dundee in June 1945 and was educated in the city at the Morgan Academy. A club cricketer for both Forfarshire and Heriot's Former Pupils, winning the Scottish Cup with the latter in 1978. He made his debut for Scotland in first-class cricket against Warwickshire at Edgbaston during Scotland's 1968 tour of England. He played first-class cricket intermittently for Ireland until 1982, making five additional appearances; four of these came against Ireland, with one coming against the touring New Zealanders. Playing in the Scottish side as a right-arm fast-medium bowler, he took 6 wickets at an average of 55.33, with best figures of 3 for 62. As a lower order batsman, he scored 23 runs with a highest score of 10.

References

External links
 

1945 births
Living people
Cricketers from Dundee
People educated at Morgan Academy
Scottish cricketers